Chhattisgarh State Medicinal Plant Board is state agency of Government of Chhattisgarh that acts as coordinating and facilitating body for herbal related works in Chhattisgarh state. It was set up in 2004.

In 2021, The Chhattisgarh State Medicinal Plant Board was renamed as the ‘Chhattisgarh Adivasi Sthaniya Swasthya Parampara Avam Aushadhi Padap Board’ (Chhattisgarh Tribal Local Health Tradition and Medicinal Plant Board)

References

External links
 Website

State agencies of Chhattisgarh
Health in Chhattisgarh
Ayurvedic organisations
Herbalism organizations
Medicinal plants of Asia
Government agencies established in 2004
2004 establishments in Chhattisgarh